Dr Margaret Elsworth MBE (born 5 December 1929, East Grinstead, Sussex) was the founder of the African Scholars' Fund and the African Scholars' Fund UK. She was educated at Micklefield and Herschel Girls School. She graduated in 1954 from the University of Cape Town with a MBChB. As a student she helped her father, Sandy Blagden, establish CAFDA, an organisation that raised funds for the development of poor communities living on the Cape Flats by selling second hand books. CAFDA bookshops still flourish today. During those years she also co-founded SHAWCO. IAfter years of working at the Red Cross Hospital she realised the priority of education in helping families rise above their impoverished conditions, and began recycling school textbooks from privileged white schools to poor black schools. In 1970 she founded the African Scholar's Fund, and later TECSAT (Technical College Student Aid Trust Western Cape). She has worked as a medical officer for the Janet Bourhill Institute from 1961 to 1994. In 1987 she was awarded an honorary Master of Social Sciences from the University of Cape Town. In 1996 she was awarded an MBE from Queen Elizabeth II for her work for charity. Her husband, Dr Jack Elsworth, died in 2003.

She was elected to the Order of Simon of Cyrene in 2010.

Sources 
 
 African Scholar's Fund Homepage
 
 
 Elsworth's ashes in Newlands Forest
 
 Mtyala, Q. 2003. 'Scientists lectures kept hundreds rapt'. Cape Argus.

1929 births
Living people
People from East Grinstead
University of Cape Town alumni
Alumni of Herschel Girls' School
Members of the Order of the British Empire